The International Racquetball Federation's 19th Racquetball World Championships are being held in San José, Costa Rica from August 10–18. This is the first time Worlds have been Costa Rica, and the first time a Central American country has hosted the event.

Tournament format
The 2018 World Championships used a two stage format with an initial group stage that was a round robin with the results used to seed players for a medal round.

Group stage

Pool A

Pool B

Pool C

Pool D

Pool E

Pool F

Pool G

Pool H

Pool I

Medal round

References

2018 Racquetball World Championships